Icking station is a railway station in the municipality of Icking, in Bavaria, Germany. It is located on the Isar Valley line of Deutsche Bahn.

Services
 the following services stop at Icking:

References

External links
 
 Icking layout 
 

Railway stations in Bavaria
Buildings and structures in Bad Tölz-Wolfratshausen
Munich S-Bahn stations